Solo Live is a solo piano album by Michel Petrucciani, recorded in 1997 at the Alte Oper in Frankfurt, Germany, and released on the Dreyfus label in 1998. A double-CD version of the concert was released in 2007, under the title Piano Solo: The Complete Concert in Germany, and featured 20 tracks instead of the original release's 11.

Music
Most of the tracks are Petrucciani originals. "Looking Up" is "overtly optimistic and inherently hopeful"; "Home" is a "statement of warmth and comfort"; "Brazilian Like" is "orchestral and melodic to the point at which the tune remains in one's head long after its conclusion".

Reception
The AllMusic review awarded it four and a half stars and described it as "Petrucciani's lasting solo gift to the jazz world". The Penguin Guide to Jazz gave it a maximum four stars and added it to the suggestsed Core Collection list.

Track listing
All tracks written by Petrucciani, unless stated otherwise.

1998 CD Release
 "Looking Up" – 4:24
 "Besame Mucho" (Consuelo Velázquez) – 4:03
 "Rachid" – 2:22
 "Chloé Meets Gershwin" – 4:08
 "Home" – 3:40
 "Brazilian Like" – 3:07
 "Little Peace in C for U" – 4:12
 "Romantic But Not Blue" – 3:22
 "Trilogy in Blois (Morning Sun, Noon Sun and Night Sun in Blois)" – 11:29
 "Caravan" (Irving Mills, Duke Ellington, Juan Tizol) – 10:09
 "She Did It Again" / "Take The A Train" (Billy Strayhorn) / "She Did It Again" – 4:53

2007 2CD Complete Release
 "Colors" – 7:43
 "Training"  – 3:12
 "Hidden Joy" – 2:46
 "Les Grelots" (Eddie Louiss) – 4:26
 "Guadeloupe" – 5:02
 "Love Letter" – 5:44
 "Little Peace in C for U" – 4:47
 Michel Petrucciani Speech  – 2:55
 "J'Aurais Tellement Voulu" – 3:30
 "Rachid"  – 2:22
 "Chloé Meets Gershwin" – 4:07
 "Home" – 3:29
 "Brazilian Like" – 3:13
 "Romantic But Not Blue" – 3:28
 "Trilogy in Blois (Morning Sun in Blois - Noon Sun in Blois - Night Sun in Blois)" – 11:48
 "Caravan" (Ellington, Tizol, Mills) – 10:46
 "Looking Up" – 3:51
 "Besame Mucho" (Velázquez) – 4:51
 "She Did It Again" – 2:08
 "Take the "A" Train" (Strayhorn) – 2:27

References

Michel Petrucciani live albums
1999 live albums
Blue Note Records live albums
Solo piano jazz albums